Bowls is one of the sports at the quadrennial Commonwealth Games competition. It has been a Commonwealth Games sport since the inaugural edition of the event's precursor, the 1930 British Empire Games. It is a core sport and must be included in the sporting programme of each edition of the Games; however, it was not included in the programme of the 1966 Commonwealth Games in Kingston, Jamaica due to no sufficient bowling greens being available. Along with swimming, athletics, cycling, table tennis, powerlifting and triathlon, bowls is one of the EAD (Elite Athletes with a Disability) sports.

Editions

Commonwealth champions
Commonwealth champions tabulated:

Men's singles

Men's pairs

Men's triples

Men's fours

Women's singles

Women's pairs

Women's triples

Women's fours

Para-sport

Men's blind singles

Men's Pairs

Women's blind singles

Women's Pairs

Mixed Pairs

Open triples

Mixed fours B2 & B3

All-time Overall medal table
*Note : From editions 1994 to 2002, two bronze medals were awarded in each event.
Updated after the 2022 Commonwealth Games

Lawn Bowls All-Time Medal Table
*Note : From editions 1994 to 2002, two bronze medals were awarded in each event.
Updated after the 2022 Commonwealth Games

Para-Lawn Bowls All-time medal table

Updated after the 2022 Commonwealth Games

See also
World Bowls Events
List of Commonwealth Games medallists in lawn bowls

References

External links
Commonwealth Games sport index

 
Commonwealth Games
Commonwealth Games
Sports at the Commonwealth Games